Marty McMillan (born 17 February 1953) is a former Australian rules footballer who played for Richmond and Footscray in the Victorian Football League (VFL) during the early 1970s.

Recruited from Mount Waverley, McMillan was a half forward flanker in the 1972 VFL Grand Final loss to Carlton where he kicked two goals in the high scoring encounter. Although not a renowned goal-kicker, he had also kicked three goals against the same opponent in their drawn Semi Final earlier in the finals series. He finished his league career at Footscray, after transferring there midway through the 1974 season.

References

Holmesby, Russell and Main, Jim (2007). The Encyclopedia of AFL Footballers. 7th ed. Melbourne: Bas Publishing.

1953 births
Living people
Richmond Football Club players
Western Bulldogs players
Australian rules footballers from Victoria (Australia)